José Angel Ledezma Quintero (born November 1, 1970), better known as El Coyote, is a Mexican banda singer.

Life
Quintero grew up in a town named Coyotitán. Before José planned to be a music artist, he wanted to play baseball professionally. Which made him travel to Mazatlán, Mexico. The capital of the big star sinaloense bands, this is where he slowly began to get the nickname El Coyote. In 1989, El Coyote debuted in La Original Banda El Limón de Salvador Lizárraga, leaving aside his baseball dreams for a moment. Music became his priority, and when he turned 19 years old he would become part of the first generation of Banda vocalists. Making his own style and texture of music which came natural with his voice. El Coyote was also a part of Banda la Costeña de Ramón López Alvarado, La Original Banda El Limón, and Banda Los Recoditos. He recorded various albums as vocalist with these groups; In 1997, El Coyote recorded an album with Los Recoditos that was not released at the time. Before starting his solo career, he had recorded the album "Me lo contaron ayer" with La Original Banda El Limón, released in 1997. The album recorded with Banda Los Recoditos for Musart, was released in 2004 as "Mis corridos escondidos". Banda Los Recoditos had re-recorded the same songs with another vocalist and released it in 1997 in an album titled "El Nylon". Finally, in December 1997, Jose Angel debuts in his first solo album "Aquí me quedaré" with EMI.

Biography 
José Ángel Ledesma Quintero is the lead performer and vocalist of El Coyote y su Banda Tierra Santa. El Coyote y su Banda Tierra Santa are with Record label Universal Music Latin Entertainment, and formerly Univision Music Group. He is also a former member of La Original Banda El Limón. Some of his top hits include "Piquites de Hormiga", "Arboles de la Barranca", "Me Dicen El Coyote", "Sufro", "Cuando Regreso a Tus Brazos", "Amor Pajarito", "Te Soñe", "Para Impressionarte", "Linda Doctora", "Besitos en el Cuello", "Y si te Robo" and many more. He was also part of Banda La Costeña.

Discography 
 1997 Aqui Me Quedare (First album)
 1998 Concedeme
 1999 Profundamente
 1999 El Amo
 2000 Te Soñe
 2001 Cuando Regreso A Tus Brazos
 2002 Puras Rancheras
 2002 El Amor No Tiene Edad
 2003 El Rancho Grande
 2004 Si te vuelves a enamorar (Last album on EMI)
 2005 Suspiros (First album on Fonovisa)
 2005 Décimo Aniversario
 2006 Prohibido
 2007 La Carretera Del Amor
 2007 La ley de la vida
 2008 El Polo Norte
 2009 Levanta Tu Vuelo (Last album on Fonovisa)
 2011 Escuela De La Vida (First album on ISA Music)
 2012 "Como Una Huella Digital"
 2014 "Alucine"
 2015 "Loco Romántico"

Note:
The album "Mis corridos escondidos" of 2004 is a disc reissue of Musart of the 1997 Banda Los Recoditos album El Nylon, but is really the first demo he did solo.

References

 Asesinan a Represantante Grupera en Guadalajara.  El Universal.  http://www.eluniversal.com.mx/notas/832393.html
 Identifican mujer muerta como la representante de José Ángel 'El Coyote' Ledesma
 http://www.vanguardia.com.mx/identificanmujermuertarepresentabaaelcoyote-1226826.html

External links
 https://coyotejoseangel.com
 https://web.archive.org/web/20090706144047/http://www.universalmusica.com/downloads/84
 http://www.buenamusica.com/el-coyote/biografia
 https://www.facebook.com/CoyoteJoseAngel/

1970 births
Banda musicians
Living people
Mexican musicians